Annexation of the West Bank may refer to:

Jordanian annexation of the West Bank (1948–1967)
Proposed Israeli annexation of the West Bank (1967–present)